Jim MacCool (born 1954) is a British dramatic poet in the shanachie or travelling bard tradition. MacCool is the author of Ionan Tales, a series of twelve lengthy tales in verse inspired by the Canterbury Tales and which he has performed more than a thousand times in places from Brisbane to Chicago since their premiere at a Sunday Times–sponsored Literary Festival at the 2000 Millennium. His shows typically combine his singing of Irish or Scots folk ballads, such as "The Belle of Belfast City" or "Whiskey in the Jar", a poetic recitation and a Celtic drum performance. MacCool is the founder and patron of Britain's National Poetry Month and in August 2006 was named poet-in-residence for Dudley, West Midlands.

On 13 November 2004, he presented two of his stories "The Boxer's Tale" and the "Story of Sawney Bean" in Pember Heath Village Hall, along with his renditions of Irish and Scottish folk ballads. One story told of a boxer's greed, drug abuse and the revenge of his lover that left him in a wheelchair, while the second told of Sawney Bean and his wife Black Agnes, who dabbled in witchcraft and cannibalism at the time of King James VI of Scotland.

During the May 2008 Malvern Fringe Festival, he performed two shows in rotation 18 times each over a six-day period. MacCool has also performed at the Buxton Fringe Festival and the Camden Fringe Festival, as well as at schools.

Jim MacCool took part in the Buxton Fringe Festival in 2008 and 2010.

References

1963 births
Living people
British poets
Lyric poets
British folk singers
Fringe theatre
British male poets